Ivyanets, also known as Ivianec, is a town in the Valozhyn District of Minsk Region, Belarus.

Ivyanets is best known as the birthplace of Felix Dzerzhinsky.

History

Lithuanian-Polish rule
Ivyanets is located in a hilly forested area on the Volma River, and its origins can be traced to the end of the 15th century in the Grand Duchy of Lithuania. Originally known as Givenech, presumably derived from Lithuanian gyventi – "to live", it was founded in 1444 as a privately owned settlement of the Sologub family, and by 1522 it was listed as a town within Minsk County of the Vilnius Voivodeship. Ivyanets was home to a primarily Protestant Calvinist community, and saw rapid growth with schools and a hospital. In 1606, a wooden church was built, and in 1640 the town was composed of 27 lots. During the Russo-Polish War (1654–1667), Ivyanets was severely damaged by Russian forces, and slowly recovered over the next century. At the beginning of the 18th century Ivyanets County was formed, with its administrative center located in the town, and in 1702 a Franciscan monastery was built by Theodore Vankovich. In 1745, Jan Michal Sologub built a stone church in the town. Sologub was the current Podskarby, the chief financial manager of the Polish–Lithuanian Commonwealth and a member of the Senate, and the owner of the town. By 1780, Ivyanets was composed of 7 streets, a market, and 174 lots.

Russian rule
In 1793, as a result of the second partition of Poland, Ivyanets became part of the Russian Empire and the center of a Minsk County township. During the January Uprising (1863-1864) against Russian rule in the former Polish–Lithuanian Commonwealth, 189 men from the town fought as insurgents on the Polish side. Following the suppression of the uprising, Russian authorities began a Russification process in the region – a public school was opened in Ivyanets, and on November 28, 1869, forcibly altered the local Church of St. Michael and the Holy Trinity to the Moscow Patriarchate of the Russian Orthodox Church. By 1880, Ivyanets had 288 houses, 2 schools, 35 shops, 17 potteries, 2 inns, 2 churches and 2 synagogues, as well as weekly auctions and 2 fairs a year. According to the census of 1897, the number of households had increased to 399, with 2 churches and 2 chapels, a public school, 2 religious schools, 2 almshouses, an emergency room, a water mill, 15 workshops of baking pots, 9 store forges, 64, 2 restaurants, vodka storage, held 2 annual fairs and auctions on Sundays. At the beginning of the 20th century, Ivyanets featured numerous hospitals and clinics,  and in 1915 years around the St. Euphrosyne of Polotsk Orthodox church was built next to the fairgrounds.

Byelorussian SSR and Polish rule
In February 1918, Ivyanets was occupied during the First World War by German troops as part of the invasion of Russia. On 25 March, 1918, Ivyanets was proclaimed part of the short-lived independent Belarusian People's Republic, but on 1 January, 1919, in accordance with the decision of the Congress of the Communist Party (Bolsheviks) of Belarus, became a part of the Byelorussian SSR, but in August 1919, Ivyanets was occupied by the Polish Army. According to the Treaty of Riga (1921) the town was included in the inter-war Second Polish Republic, in 1923 becoming part of Wołożyn (Valozhyn) County in the Nowogródek Voivodeship, and was now  from the Belarusian SSR border. In 1934, the electrification of Ivyanets began when individuals from the town founded a power plant on the Volma River, on the land of a former Sologub family property. In 1936, Ivyanets built a new school, and by 1938 the town had 574 buildings (including 10 stone) and a military airport.

Soviet rule
In September 1939, Ivyanets was occupied by the Red Army and, on 14 November 1939, incorporated into the Byelorussian SSR.

Nazi German occupation and Jewish massacres
From 25 June 1941 until 6 July 1944, Ivyanets was occupied by Nazi Germany and administered as a part of the Generalbezirk Weißruthenien of Reichskommissariat Ostland. In 1941, there were probably about 1,200 Jews residing in Ivyanets district. On September 5, 1941, 50 male Jews from the town were shot. In November 1941, the Germans established an enclosed Jewish ghetto in Ivyanets which also received Jews from the surrounding villages. In early 1942, some Jews were selected and sent to other ghettos established in Poland, such as one in Navahrudak, as the Germans liquidated the Ivyanets ghetto on June 9, 1942. That day, about 800 victims were shot in a pit in a forest outside of town.
On June 19, the Polish Partisan Unit from the AK Stołpce District captured Iwieniec and destroyed the local German garrison. The city was free for a dozen or so hours. These events went down in history as the 'Iwieniec Uprising'. In revenge for the defeat, the Germans later murdered about 150 inhabitants of Iwieniec, and many others were deported to forced labor

Notable people
Felix Dzerzhinsky, Bolshevik revolutionary and Soviet statesman, born on an estate near Ivyanets in 1877.
Yitzhak Isaac Halevy Rabinowitz rabbi, Jewish historian, and founder of the Agudath Israel organization, born in 1847.

Gallery

References

External links 
 Photos on Radzima.org
 Jurkau kutoczak — Юркаў куточак — Yury's Corner. Дойлідства Івянца 
 Photos on Globus.tut.by
 Photos of both Roman Catholic churches in details
 website of Iwieniec/Ivyanets
 

Holocaust locations in Belarus
Minsky Uyezd
Nowogródek Voivodeship (1919–1939)
Populated places in Minsk Region
Urban-type settlements in Belarus
Valozhyn District
Vilnius Voivodeship
Wilno Voivodeship (1926–1939)